Brigadier John Handcock Studdert,  (20 December 1923 – 18 February 2003) was an Australian Army officer, and in retirement a farmer and organiser of his local Rural Fire Service (RFS) branch. He is best remembered for his service as the Commandant of the Officer Training Unit Scheyville.

Early years
Jack Studdert was born in Bungonia, New South Wales in December 1923, the oldest son of Charles Handcock Studdert and Bertha Geraldine Cripps-Clark. His father was born at Danganelly House in County Clare, Ireland, emigrated to Australia in 1912, and was the manager of the Spring Ponds property at Bungonia.

Before his father's death in 1936, John (known as Pat to his family) moved with his parents, sister Vivien and brother Charles (known as Mick), to their own property (which Charles senior named Danganelly after his birthplace), on the banks of the Wollondilly River at Towrang, about 15 km north of Goulburn. John was educated at Goulburn High School. The property remains in the family, run since the mid-1950s by John's brother Mick.

Military career
Studdert graduated from Royal Military College, Duntroon in December 1943, and was commissioned as a lieutenant in the Royal Australian Artillery (RAA). During the Second World War he served with the 2/6th Field Regiment in the Netherlands East Indies (Halmahera and Borneo), with the occupation forces in Japan, and with the Headquarters of the 34th Infantry Brigade. After the war he was posted as an instructor at the Artillery School, North Head, and subsequently as Adjutant of the 6th Field Regiment in Tasmania. After attending the Canadian Staff College at Kingston, Ontario, he was appointed as the Instructor Artillery at the Royal Military College and subsequently attended the Royal Military College of Science, Shrivenham in England.

In April 1960, Studdert became the first Commanding Officer of the re-raised 4th Field Regiment, tasked with preparing the unit for service in Vietnam. Before their deployment, he was posted as the Technical Staff Officer Grade 1 at the Australian High Commission in London. This was followed by a number of materiel related postings.

In 1969 Studdert was posted as the Commandant of the Officer Training Unit, Scheyville, until May 1972. For his service as commandant, he was appointed an Officer of the Order of the British Empire.

Studdert moved to Canberra in 1972, serving in the Materiel Division and retiring in December 1978 as the Deputy Chief of Materiel. For his work in Materiel Division he was made an Officer of the Order of Australia.

Retirement
In the 24 years following his retirement, Studdert returned to the region where he grew up and worked a property, Bunratty, just south of Goulburn. He spent most of those years as the Secretary of the local Gundarry Bush Fire Brigade, where he wrote a 5-year equipment replacement and upgrade plan, established an effective command, control and communications system for the Brigade and planned and implemented regular and meaningful training for the fire fighters.

Studdert suffered a series of heart attacks from October 2002 and died in Canberra Hospital on 18 February 2003. He was buried at the Goulburn cemetery; the funeral service at St Nicholas' church was well attended and the Rural Fire Service provided the pallbearers.

Family
Jack Studdert was survived by:
 his wife of 52 years, Mavis, 
 his sons David and 
 Martin [Colonel Martin Charles Studdert AM; a.k.a. Marty Studdert],
 his daughter Fiona, 
 their partners Valerie, Helena and Nick and 
 two grandchildren Nicholas and Hannah.

Other relations:
 Father: Charles Handcock Studdert 
 Mother: Bertha Geraldine Cripps-Clark
 Sister: Vivien
 Brother: Charles Herbert "Mick" Studdert

References

Further reading
 The Scheyvillian, O.T.U. National Newsletter No. 2, 2003 – ANZAC Edition
 Tony Sonneveld (2003) Commandant passing – Brig. John Studdert AO, OBE, The Scheyvillian, O.T.U. National Newsletter No. 2, 2003 – ANZAC Edition, pg.6 
 Geoff Bennett (2003)  ... And to the final parade, The Scheyvillian, O.T.U. National Newsletter No. 2, 2003 – ANZAC Edition, pg.13

1923 births
2003 deaths
Military personnel from New South Wales
Australian brigadiers
Australian farmers
Australian firefighters
Australian Army personnel of World War II
Australian Officers of the Order of the British Empire
Officers of the Order of Australia
People from Goulburn
Royal Military College, Duntroon graduates